Tokyo Beat Down  is a 2008 side-scrolling beat-em-up released for the Nintendo DS. It is published by Success (Japan) and Atlus USA (North America) and developed by Tamsoft.

The story takes place in Yaesu, home of the so-called "Beast Cops". As the name implies, these Beast Cops have extreme methods of taking criminals down in Tokyo.

Tokyo Beat Down was released in Japan on September 18, 2008 and in North America on March 31, 2009.

Reception

Tokyo Beat Down received "mixed" reviews according to the review aggregation website Metacritic. Ray Barnholt of 1UP described the game as "deliberately archaic" but worthwhile for gamers who "have a fondness for action games past." Michael Cole of Nintendo World Report cited its "fairly fluid" combat and praised its "stilted, tongue-in-cheek cop drama dialogue" as making "Beat Down more memorable". On the other hand, Austin Light of GameSpot found "the crazy story and absurd characters...entertaining,...they aren't worth mashing your way through hours of poor combat to see."  In Japan, Famitsu gave it a score of two sixes, one four, and one six for a total of 22 out of 40.

Notes

 Known in Japan as

References

External links
Official U.S Site
Official Japanese Site

2008 video games
Atlus games
Beat 'em ups
Nintendo DS-only games
Nintendo DS games
Video games about police officers
Video games developed in Japan
Success (company) games